Seán Sherlock (born 6 December 1972) is an Irish Labour Party politician who has been a Teachta Dála (TD) for the Cork East constituency since the 2007 general election. He served as a Minister of State from 2011 to 2016.

Early life
Sherlock was born in Cork in 1972, but is a native of Mallow, County Cork. He is the son of Joe Sherlock, who at the time was an Official Sinn Féin member of Cork County Council. He was educated locally at St. Patrick's Boys' National School and the Patrician Academy, before later attending Cork College of Commerce. Sherlock subsequently studied at University College Galway, where he completed a degree in Economics and Politics.

Political career
Sherlock first became directly involved in politics when he served a six-month internship with MEP Proinsias De Rossa, in his office at the European Parliament. Following the completion of his internship he was offered a full-time job working as an assistant to de Rossa.

In 2002, Sherlock served as election manager for his father in his attempt to win back a seat in the Cork East constituency at the general election as a Labour Party candidate. The campaign was successful; Joe Sherlock returned to Dáil Éireann after a ten-year absence.

The abolition of the dual mandate in 2003 meant that Joe Sherlock had to vacate his seats on Mallow Town Council and Cork County Council. Seán was co-opted onto both councils that year. The following year he won both seats in his own right when he was successful at the local elections. He was then elected Mayor of Mallow.

When Joe Sherlock announced that he would not be contesting the 2007 general election, Seán was selected to succeed him. He contested Cork East for the Labour Party and was elected. A Fianna Fáil-led government returned to office for the third successive election. Seán Sherlock was appointed Labour Party Spokesperson on Agriculture and Food.

Minister of State
Sherlock retained his Dáil seat at the 2011 general election, topping the poll in Cork East. He was appointed by the new Fine Gael–Labour coalition government as Minister of State at the Department of Jobs, Enterprise and Innovation and at the Department of Education and Skills with special responsibility for Research and Innovation.

In January 2012, Sherlock proposed legislation to give copyright holders the right to seek an injunction against copyright violators. A group called "Stop SOPA Ireland" petitioned against the legislation, comparisons being made between these reforms and the Stop Online Piracy Act in the United States. Sherlock said such comparisons were "not based on fact". According to the Irish government the legislation was intended to close a loophole after a High Court case in 2010, in which EMI sued UPC, an internet service provider, over illegal downloads. A denial-of-service attack was performed against government websites in protest over the changes. On 29 February 2012, Sherlock signed the legislation, citing Ireland's "obligations under EU law". The legislation subsequently resulted in the blocking of The Pirate Bay in Ireland.

On 15 July 2014, he was appointed as Minister of State at the Department of Foreign Affairs and Trade with special responsibility for Overseas Development Aid, Trade Promotion and North–South Cooperation.

Return to opposition
Following the 2016 general election, Sherlock was one of seven remaining Labour TDs. He opposed returning to coalition with Fine Gael during the government formation talks that year. He continued to serve as a junior minister until the new government was formed on 6 May 2016. He was Party Spokesperson on Children and Youth Affairs and the Environment in the 32nd Dáil.

Sherlock was re-elected at the 2020 general election. When Brendan Howlin stood down as party leader in 2020, Sherlock ruled out contesting the Labour Party leadership election. He nominated Alan Kelly, who would defeat Aodhán Ó Ríordáin. In July 2020, Sherlock was appointed Labour Party Spokesperson on Social Protection, Rural and Community Affairs and the Islands, including Agriculture and the Marine.

See also
Families in the Oireachtas

References

External links
Seán Sherlock's page on the Labour Party website

 

1972 births
Living people
Alumni of the University of Galway
Labour Party (Ireland) TDs
Local councillors in County Cork
Members of the 30th Dáil
Members of the 31st Dáil
Members of the 32nd Dáil
Members of the 33rd Dáil
Ministers of State of the 31st Dáil
People from Mallow, County Cork
Politicians from County Cork